The International Gay & Lesbian Aquatics Association (known as IGLA) is the international governing body for predominantly LGBT+ aquatics clubs, representing the sports of swimming, diving, artistic swimming, water polo, and open water swimming. Member clubs are from 16 countries, with the majority of clubs in the United States and Canada. Past presidents of the association have included Scott Kohanowski (of Team New York Aquatics) and Gareth Johnson (of Out to Swim London).

IGLA is one of the key organisations involved in the licensing of the Gay Games, which are held every four years. In years in which the Gay Games are not held, IGLA holds an international competition open to its member clubs. The organization is a part of the larger movement of a niche travel industry, LGBTQ sports tourism.

History
The IGLA name was chosen in 1987 to keep the community spirit of competition going from the recently held Gay Olympics that was started in San Francisco by Tom Waddell. The Gay Olympics was later forced to change its name to Gay Games but the event itself was successful in allowing LGBT athletes from around the world to compete in Olympic, exhibition and art events. To carry on the international aspect for the LGBT aquatics community the International Gay and Lesbian Aquatics was named to hold a yearly international championship event. By Gay Games III, IGLA was officially a part of the Games organizing.

Championships

The host cities for the championships have been:
 1987: IGLA I, San Diego, California
 1988: IGLA II, San Diego, California
 1989: IGLA III, Vancouver, British Columbia
 1990: Held in conjunction with Gay Games III, Vancouver, British Columbia
 1991: IGLA IV, Los Angeles, California
 1992: IGLA V, Seattle, Washington
 1993: IGLA VI, Chicago, Illinois
 1994: Held in conjunction with Gay Games IV, New York, New York
 1995: IGLA VII, Montreal, Québec
 1996: IGLA VIII, Washington, D.C.
 1997: IGLA IX, San Diego, California
 1998: Held in conjunction with Gay Games V, Amsterdam, Netherlands
 1999: IGLA X, Atlanta, Georgia
 2000: IGLA XI, Paris, France
 2001: IGLA XII, Toronto, Ontario
 2002: Held in conjunction with Gay Games VI, Sydney, Australia
 2003: IGLA XIII, San Francisco, California
 2004: IGLA XIV, Fort Lauderdale, Florida
 2005: IGLA XV, Atlanta, Georgia
 2006: Held in conjunction with Gay Games VII, Chicago, Illinois
 2007: IGLA XVI, Paris, France
 2008: IGLA XVII, Washington, D.C.
 2009: IGLA XVIII, Copenhagen, Denmark
 2010: Held in conjunction with Gay Games VIII, Cologne, Germany
 2011: IGLA XIX, Honolulu, Hawaii
 2012: IGLA XX, Reykjavík, Iceland
 2013: IGLA XXI, Seattle, Washington
 2014: Held in conjunction with Gay Games IX, Cleveland, Ohio
 2015: IGLA XXII, Stockholm, Sweden
 2016: Edmonton, Alberta
 2017: IGLA 30th Anniversary - Miami
 2018: Held in conjunction with Gay Games X, Paris, France
 2019: IGLA XXXI, New York City
 2020: IGLA XXXII, Melbourne, Australia
 2021: IGLA XXXIII, Salt Lake City, Utah, United States - Cancelled due to Covid-19
 2022: IGLA XXXIV, Palm Springs, California

References

External links 
 
 IGLA Water Polo

International LGBT sports organizations